Tennis in Italy is the 6th sport, with 1,298,000 people, by number of practitioners.

History
The four most successful Italian tennis players with regard to Grand Slam tournament results are Nicola Pietrangeli (1959 French Championships and 1960 French Championships), Adriano Panatta (1976 French Open), Francesca Schiavone (2010 French Open) and Flavia Pennetta (2015 US Open).

Also the Italy Davis Cup team won the 1976 Davis Cup, and the Italy Fed Cup team won four times the Fed Cup in 2006, 2009, 2010, and 2013.

Women's tennis in particular has seen tremendous successes in the 21st century, with the advent of Francesca Schiavone, Sara Errani, Flavia Pennetta and Roberta Vinci. All four of these women reached the top 10 of the WTA rankings in both singles and doubles (with Schiavone and Errani reaching the top 5 in singles and Pennetta, Errani and Vinci reaching No 1 in doubles), and reached Grand Slam finals in both disciplines. Schiavone and Pennetta won singles Grand Slam titles, while Pennetta, Errani and Vinci won doubles Grand Slam titles, with Errani and Vinci achieving the Career Grand Slam in doubles as a pair. They were also responsible for Italy's 4 Fed Cup victories as members of the national Fed Cup team.

Players best singles ranking
In this table only those who have reached the top 20 in the world singles ranking.
 Updated to 12 September 2022. Data refer to the Open Era (from 1968).

Men

Women

Grand slam best singles results

Men

Nine Italian tennis players played at least the semi-final in a Grand Slam tournament.

Women

Eight Italian female tennis players have reached at least the semifinals of a Grand Slam singles tournament.

All tournament winners in Open Era

Male
As of 12 February 2023, 82 tournaments have been won by 27 Italian tennis players in the major circuit.

Female
As of 22 May 2022, 75 tournaments have been won by 19 Italian tennis players in the major circuit.

All-italian finals in Open Era

Male
There were seven all-italian finals in Open Era in the ATP Tour.

Female

See also
ATP Tour records
Sport in Italy
Italy Davis Cup team
Italy Fed Cup team
Italian Tennis Federation

References

External links
Italian Tennis Federation official site